The Ottawa Nationals were a professional men's ice hockey team out of Ottawa that played in the World Hockey Association (WHA) during the 1972–73 WHA season.

The WHA had originally granted a franchise to Doug Michel for "Ontario."  Original plans called for the team to play at Maple Leaf Gardens in Toronto, but Michel couldn't get a favourable lease.  Afterward, it was  expected that Hamilton would be the team's home, but it was eventually placed in Ottawa. Nick Trbovich became majority owner before the season began, with Michel running hockey operations.

They were coached by Billy Harris and led on the ice by Wayne Carleton, who scored 42 goals and 92 points during the season. They hosted the first-ever WHA game, on October 11, 1972, losing 7-4 to the Alberta Oilers.

Their home arena was the Ottawa Civic Centre, but they were a flop at the box office, averaging about 3,000 fans per game. Before the season ended, the City of Ottawa demanded a payment of $100,000 to secure dates for the following season.  Rather than agree, the Nationals opted to move elsewhere for the next season and play its playoff dates in Toronto. During this playoff series, the team was referred to as the Ontario Nationals. After the season, the team was sold to John F. Bassett and became the Toronto Toros.

The last Ottawa Nationals player active in North American major professional hockey was Mike Amodeo, who played one season in the NHL, 1979-80, before moving to Sweden, then Italy, before his retirement in 1983.

Season-by-season record
Note: GP = Games played, W = Wins, L = Losses, T = Ties, Pts = Points, GF = Goals for, GA = Goals against, PIM = Penalties in minutes

External links
 1972-73 Ottawa Nationals Roster & Stats on HockeyDB.com

See also
 Ice hockey in Ottawa
List of ice hockey teams in Ontario

Defunct ice hockey teams in Canada
World Hockey Association teams
Nat
Ice hockey clubs established in 1972
Ice hockey clubs disestablished in 1973
1972 establishments in Ontario
1973 disestablishments in Ontario